Brad Henderson Memorial Stadium is a football stadium in Macon, Georgia. It is the home field of the Southwest-Macon Patriots and the Central-Macon Chargers.

The stadium was named after Brad Henderson (son of high school football coach Billy Henderson), who died in an automobile accident in Macon on September 7, 1964.

References

College football venues
Sports venues in Georgia (U.S. state)
Multi-purpose stadiums in the United States
Buildings and structures in Macon, Georgia
High school football venues in the United States